Diggstown (known as Midnight Sting in the UK), is a 1992 American sports comedy-drama film  directed by Michael Ritchie and written by Steven McKay, based on the 1978 novel The Diggstown Ringers by Leonard Wise. It stars James Woods, Louis Gossett Jr., Bruce Dern, Heather Graham, Oliver Platt and Randall "Tex" Cobb.

Plot

Gabriel Caine (James Woods), a con man, is released from prison in Winfield, Georgia and immediately gets to work on his next scam. Caine and his partner, Daniel Patrick O'Shannon "Fitz" Fitzpatrick (Oliver Platt), travel to a small town not far from the prison: Diggstown, a city obsessed with boxing.

A mean-spirited man named John Gillon (Bruce Dern) owns almost all of Diggstown. He is feared by many but also respected because he is the former manager of Diggstown's pride and joy, the once-famous boxer Charles Macom Diggs, the man for whom the town is named.

Upon hearing a remark that Diggs once knocked out five fighters in one day, Fitz “drunkenly” says he knows of a fighter who could knock out any 10 in one day: Honey Roy Palmer. Gillon tries to take advantage of the situation and bets Fitz $100,000 that no one man can best ten Diggstown boxers in one day. Caine quickly volunteers to finance Fitz's bet and the con is on.

Caine seeks out an old buddy, Palmer (Louis Gossett Jr.), who is now a 48-year-old YMCA supervisor. After some initial reluctance, Palmer agrees to participate and starts to train for the fight. Caine and Gillon agree to various conditions of the bet, with “one day” being 24 full hours and “Diggstown fighters” being able to come from any surrounding area of Olivair County. A loan shark backs Caine's bet, with the understanding that his health and welfare will be riding on the outcome.

Caine discovers that Gillon's treachery (and his bank account) goes deeper than Diggstown people know. As his manager, Gillon drugged Diggs during a fight so that Gillon could collect on the opponent's long odds. Diggs suffered irreversible brain damage as a result. With help from Emily Forrester, his prison buddy Edward "Wolf" Forrester's sister (Heather Graham), it is learned that Gillon has more than $1.5 million in assets. Caine tricks him into risking all of it. Now it is up to Honey Roy Palmer to defeat all 10 of Diggstown's men.

They begin with:
 Buck Holland (played by former heavyweight boxing contender Rocky Pepeli), who puts up a good fight.  Palmer barely beats him.
 Slim Busby, who like his brother, Hambone, has been bribed by Caine to take a dive.
 Billy Hargrove (played by James Caviezel), who is easily beat.
 Sam Lester (played by Roger Hewlett), who is secretly given a laxative before the fight and eventually runs from the ring.
 Hambone Busby, who, like his brother, has been bribed to take a dive. Gillon, however, threatens to kill Hambone's brother, Slim, unless he is victorious in the ring. Hambone fights a vicious fight, but is ultimately defeated. Slim is indeed found murdered.
    
Palmer is enraged. His next fight is with Sonny Hawkins, who is easily dispatched. Robby Gillon, the son of John Gillon, approaches the ring next, but then backs out under instructions from his father. His cowardice is regarded as a forfeit. Frank Mangrum officially loses to disqualification after kicking Palmer in the groin, then hitting the referee then gets knocked out by Palmer. Tank Miller, a gargantuan fighter, is next. He puts up a good fight, but a tiring Palmer eventually beats him.

That brings up Diggstown's best man, Hammerhead Hagan, the only fighter ever to actually beat Palmer during their professional careers. He is brought in as a surprise ringer. Gillon moved him in as a county resident just before the bet rules were established, meaning that Hagan can legally fight.

The bout is one-sided. Palmer looks done for, but he gets new motivation after seeing Diggs, who is sitting courtside, move his hand slightly (which he interprets as a show of support). Caine, not wanting to see his friend die, attempts to throw in the towel, but Palmer catches it and throws it back. Palmer rallies to knock out his opponent.

Palmer, Caine and Fitz begin their celebration of this miraculous feat. They are cut short by Gillon, who notes that his son never entered the ring -– therefore, only nine fights have transpired. The true tenth fighter is then introduced: Minoso Torres, a tough-as-nails boxer who ruled the boxing underground in the prison from which Caine was recently released. No one has ever defeated him. Gillon admonishes Caine with: "Never try to hustle a hustler."

An exhausted Palmer is no match for Torres. But just when all looks lost, Caine whistles at Torres, gets his attention, straightens his tie and does a thumbs-down gesture (copying a move Gillon did earlier). Torres drops his gloves and invites Palmer to hit him, hitting the canvas, knocked out. Caine was expecting such a trick from Gillon and bribed Torres long ago for a moment like this.

Gillon has lost everything, leading Caine to correct him with an admonishment: "Actually, I believe it goes: Never con a con-man, especially one who's better than you are."  Calm at first, he snaps and pulls a gun. His son, Robby, tries to intervene and Gillon smacks him. Palmer then grabs Gillon and prepares to deck him. Instead, he turns to Hambone, claiming, "My hands hurt. You want to do this?" Hambone gladly obliges and delivers Gillon a powerful knockout blow.

Caine congratulates Palmer: "What you did," he says, "couldn't be done."  To which Palmer replies, "Now, you motivate me".

Cast
 James Woods as Gabriel Caine
 Louis Gossett Jr. as "Honey" Roy Palmer
 Bruce Dern as John Gillon
 Oliver Platt as Daniel Patrick O'Shannon "Fitz" Fitzpatrick
 Heather Graham as Emily Forrester
 Randall "Tex" Cobb as Edward "Wolf" Forrester
 Thomas Wilson Brown as Robby Gillon
 Jim Caviezel as Billy Hargrove

Production
Filming for Diggstown took place in Montana, as well as in Los Angeles and Sacramento, California.

Reception
Leonard Maltin gave the film two and a half stars, calling it "amiable," but complains "the script is contrived". Vincent Canby of The New York Times called it Ritchie's most entertaining film since the mid-1970's, and praising the cast. The Los Angeles Times said the cast livened up "what could have been an overly cute entertainment".

Box office
The film flopped at the box office, making $4.8 million in its theatrical run, well below its $17 million budget.

References

External links
 
 
 

1992 films
1992 comedy-drama films
1990s sports comedy-drama films
American boxing films
American sports comedy-drama films
Films about con artists
Films based on American novels
Films directed by Michael Ritchie
Films scored by James Newton Howard
Films set in Georgia (U.S. state)
Films shot in Los Angeles
Films shot in Montana
Films shot in Sacramento, California
Films about gambling
Metro-Goldwyn-Mayer films
1990s English-language films
1990s American films